Tropical Storm Cindy was a weak but unusually wet Atlantic tropical cyclone that caused disastrous floods and mudslides across Martinique in August 1993. Cindy formed east of the island and became the annual hurricane season's third named storm on August 14. Due to unfavorable atmospheric conditions, Cindy remained disorganized throughout its journey across the northeastern Caribbean Sea. It made landfall in the Dominican Republic as a tropical depression on August 16, and dissipated over the territory the following day.

Despite its poor cloud structure, Cindy dropped torrential rain over portions of the northeastern Caribbean. The island of Martinique received a record  of rain over a 24-hour period, causing severe river flooding throughout northern villages and communes. Le Prêcheur was particularly devastated by an extensive debris flow, which dragged away entire structures. The storm wrought $19 million (1993 USD) in damage across Martinique, and left two people dead and hundreds homeless on the island. En route to Hispaniola, Cindy affected the Virgin Islands and Puerto Rico with rough surf and moderate rain. Heavy downpours and flooding killed two people in the Dominican Republic, though the exact extent of the damage there is unknown.

Meteorological history

The origins of Tropical Storm Cindy can be traced to a tropical wave that departed the western coast of Africa on August 8, 1993. Over the following days, the wave tracked steadily west-northwestward across the tropical Atlantic while retaining a distinct cloud pattern on satellite images. Although data from a reconnaissance aircraft mission on August 13 indicated that the system lacked a defined wind circulation, a second mission at 12:00 UTC the next day revealed an improvement in its structure at the lower levels of the atmosphere. The National Hurricane Center (NHC) thus classified the system as a tropical depression—a tropical cyclone with sustained winds of less than —and initiated public advisories on it soon thereafter.

Steered by a mid- to low-level wind flow, the depression continued west-northwest toward Martinique, decelerating in reaction to the island's northern mountain range. Satellite images on the afternoon of August 14 showed the development of a central dense overcast, as greater atmospheric turbulence over the rugged terrain amplified the cyclone's convection; the next reconnaissance flight revealed that wind speeds near the center had increased to gale force. Based on these observations, the NHC upgraded the depression to Tropical Storm Cindy around 18:00 UTC, at which time the cyclone was located over Martinique with winds of 40 mph (65 km). Although Cindy briefly developed a favorable outflow, its upper-level structure debilitated after it moved away from the Lesser Antilles, impeding further development. Over the course of August 15, Cindy's cloud pattern remained disorganized due to unfavorable wind shear; the center of circulation became ill-defined, with the strongest thunderstorms confined to the eastern portion of the cyclone.

Shortly after peaking in strength, Cindy began to interact with the mountains of Hispaniola. The high terrain disrupted its circulation, causing it to weaken to a tropical depression at 21:00 UTC on August 16. It became increasingly diffuse over land, prompting the NHC to declassify it as a tropical cyclone on August 17. The remnants proceeded inland near the border with Haiti and emerged into the Atlantic, where they spread across the Bahamas before dissipating the next day.

Preparations
When Cindy became a tropical cyclone on August 14, tropical storm warnings were issued for the Lesser Antilles from Martinique northward to the Virgin Islands. A tropical storm watch was posted for Puerto Rico at the time. As Cindy drifted farther north on August 15, the watch for Puerto Rico was upgraded to a tropical storm warning. Officials issued flash flood warnings for parts of the island, and about 600 people living in flood-prone areas sought shelter ahead of the storm. Ferry service between Fajardo and the offshore islands of Culebra and Vieques was suspended, leaving about 400 passengers stranded for a day. A price freeze was placed on emergency supplies such as wood, nails, batteries, kerosene, and lanterns.

On August 15, a tropical storm warning was issued for the Dominican Republic, from Samaná to Cabo Engaño along the northern coast and westward to Isla Beata off the southwestern coast. Thousands of residents stocked up on bottled water, canned goods, and gas, although many stores in and around the capital remained closed for the day. The Santo Domingo International Airport suspended all flight operations on the morning of August 16. The tropical storm warning for the island was discontinued when Cindy made landfall as no more than a weak tropical depression. In Cuba, a storm alert was issued for eastern provinces as forecasters warned of possibly heavy rainfall.

Impact

Martinique
On August 14, Cindy passed over Martinique with rough winds and particularly violent rain, amplified by the storm's interaction with the rising terrain. The greatest quantities fell to the northeast of a line between Sainte-Marie and Fort-de-France, with day totals of more than  recorded at every weather station in that region. The highest 1- and 24-hour rainfall rates were observed in Le Prêcheur, totaling , respectively.

Initially, Cindy's brisk winds downed banana trees and power lines across northern Martinique. After hours of continued rain, several rivers—such as the Rivière des Pères, Rivière Claire and Rivière Sèche—quickly swelled and overflowed. Severe flooding and mudslides swept through northern villages, submerging homes and destroying roads and bridges. News footage on national television showed "cars [being] swept away to sea and buried in mud". The Prêcheur River, which normally flows at 18 ft3/s (0.5 m3/s), burst its banks upon attaining an exceptional discharge rate of nearly 25,000 ft3/s (700 m3/s). Large amounts of volcanic matter from the riverbed congealed into a massive debris flow, which struck the small commune of Le Prêcheur. Flash floods surged through the village of Grand'Rivière following the overflow of its river, devastating property and drowning one person. Despite recent improvements to its flood defenses, the Rivière Roxelane rapidly topped its banks and inundated much of Saint-Pierre. Farther south, a combination of torrential rainfall and poor storm drains resulted in flood damage to private property and an aquafarm in Le Morne-Vert.

In all, Cindy killed 2 people, injured 11, and destroyed more than 150 homes across Martinique. Monetary losses reached ₣107 million ($19 million), with road damage comprising ₣68 million ($12 million). After the storm's passage, thousands of people on the island sought refuge in emergency shelters, and about 3,000 residents became homeless. La Capricieuse, a French Navy ship stationed in French Guiana, delivered disaster relief supplies to Fort-de-France; the goods included 250 packages with clothing items, distributed by the Lions Club Association of Saint Barthélemy. Unseasonable sea conditions in Cindy's wake hindered local fishers from selling their catch to trading vessels in Petite Martinique. Due to the severity of the flooding in Martinique, waterways and harbors were dredged, and river banks and dykes were reinforced to prevent recurrence.

Other islands in the Lesser Antilles
Minimal effects were felt elsewhere in the Lesser Antilles. Wind gusts at Raizet Airport reached , just below tropical storm force. Farther south, a weather station in Saint Lucia recorded  of precipitation, as well as light winds. As Cindy passed south of the Virgin Islands, unsettled seas caused minor beach erosion along the islands' southern shores, with swells of  reported at Saint Croix.

Greater Antilles

On August 16, Cindy made its closest point of approach to Puerto Rico, although its center remained well south of the island. Impact from the storm was therefore limited to intermittent downpours and  waves along the southern coast. The rough seas caused some minor erosion to beach facilities.

Upon the storm's landfall in the country, winds reached  in Barahona. The rain filled rivers and caused scattered street flooding, affecting hundreds of houses. In Villa Altagracia, one fatality occurred when a child drowned in flood waters; the final death toll for the country stood at two. There were no reports of damage elsewhere after Cindy's rapid demise over Hispaniola, though its remnants likely produced localized showers in Haiti.

See also

Other storms named Cindy
List of wettest tropical cyclones by country
Tropical Storm Erika

References

External links
The NHC's Storm Wallet Archive for Tropical Storm Cindy
The NHC's Public Advisory Archive for Tropical Storm Cindy
The 1993 Monthly Weather Review

Cindy
Cindy (1993)
Cindy (1993)
Cindy (1993)
Cindy (1993)
August 1993 events